St Paul's Church in Cashel Street, Christchurch, was a Category I heritage building registered by the New Zealand Historic Places Trust. It was demolished after the February 2011 Christchurch earthquake.

History

St Paul's was built in 1877 as a Presbyterian church on the corner of Cashel and Madras Streets in the Christchurch Central City. It replaced an earlier church on the corner of Lichfield and Madras Streets built by a breakaway congregation from St Andrew's Church. Both church buildings were designed by Samuel Farr; the later one commissioned by the reverend John Elmslie. In 1969, St Paul's merged with the Trinity-Pacific Congregational Church taking on a new name – St Pauls Trinity Pacific Presbyterian Church.  Rev. Leonard Jones and Kenape Faletoese lead the new multicultural church under its new format.  The Palangi membership of the church declined over the next three decades and by the time of its destruction in the February 2011 earthquake, the church membership was mostly of Samoan heritage.

On 5 August 2009, the church was the victim of an arson attack that caused considerable damage. The building was restored, but suffered damage in the 2010 Canterbury earthquake, and partially collapsed in the February 2011 Christchurch earthquake. By June 2011, the church had been demolished.

Heritage listing
St Paul's was listed as a Category I heritage building by the New Zealand Historic Places Trust on 2 April 1985 with registration number 305. The building was removed from the register during 2011.

References

Religious buildings and structures in Christchurch
Heritage New Zealand Category 1 historic places in Canterbury, New Zealand
Presbyterian churches in New Zealand
Churches completed in 1877
Buildings and structures demolished as a result of the 2011 Christchurch earthquake
Buildings and structures demolished in 2011
Christchurch Central City
Former churches in New Zealand
Christianity in Christchurch
Listed churches in New Zealand
1870s architecture in New Zealand
Destroyed churches
1877 establishments in New Zealand